The 1993 SEC men's basketball tournament took place from March 11–14, 1993 in downtown Lexington, Kentucky at Rupp Arena, the home court of the University of Kentucky Wildcats. Tournament coverage was provided in its entirety by Jefferson Pilot Sports, who at the time was in its sixth season with regional syndication rights to the SEC. Tom Hammond and Ed Murphy provided play-by-play commentary.

The Kentucky Wildcats won the SEC Tournament championship to, and received the SEC’s automatic bid to the 1993 NCAA Division I Men’s Basketball Tournament by defeating the LSU Tigers by a score of 82–65.

Bracket

References

SEC men's basketball tournament
1992–93 Southeastern Conference men's basketball season
1993 in sports in Kentucky
Basketball competitions in Lexington, Kentucky
College basketball tournaments in Kentucky